Đorđe Gogov (Serbian Cyrillic: Ђорђе Гогов; born 5 September 1988, in Dimitrovgrad, Serbia) is a Serbian singer, musician, and television personality. He came to media attention as one of sixteen contestants on the B92's Operacija trijumf, Balkan version of Endemol's Fame Academy. As one of four members of OT Band, he took part in Beovizija 2009, with the song "Blagoslov za kraj", and the band placed 2nd in the final.

Personal life 
Đorđe Gogov is a former professional high jumper, but had to give up of athletic career because he had no conditions for trainings. He was the first Serbian at the age of 14 to jump over 200 cm, with a 201 cm jump. Gogov admires artists such as Ivana Peters, Negative, Dado Topić, Gibonni, Lenny Kravitz, and Glen Hughes. He finds himself in a song "Eye of the Tiger".

Career

Operacija trijumf
The Operacija trijumf, Balkan version of Endemol's Fame Academy, started broadcasting on 29 September 2008. Đorđe Gogov was gained great popularity, and was among the favourites for the win. However, he was expelled at the ninth gala event, losing to Vukašin Brajić; everyone was surprised, Brajić perhaps the most. Gogov performed with the expelled students Nikola Sarić and Nikola Paunović at the semi-finals event. They covered Billy Idol's hits "White Wedding", "Rebel Yell" and "L.A. Woman".

During the Operacija trijumf, Gogov performed the following songs:
  Električni orgazam – "Ja ne postojim" with the student Ivan (did not enter) (Gala 1)
  Laka – "Džemper" with Laka (Gala 2)
  Oliver Mandić – "Nije za nju" (Gala 3)
  Bryan Adams – "Summer of '69" (Gala 4)
  Guns N' Roses – "Paradise City" (Gala 5)
  Azra – "A šta da radim" with the student Nikola Paunović (Gala 6)
  Dino Dvornik – "Ti si mi u mislima" (Gala 7)
  Divlje jagode – "Motori" with Divlje jagode (Gala 8)
  Deep Purple – "Soldier of Fortune" (Gala 9)
  Lenny Kravitz – "Are You Gonna Go My Way" with the student Vukašin Brajić (Gala 9)
  Billy Idol – "White Wedding" / "Rebel Yell"/"L.A. Woman with the students Nikola Paunović and Nikola Sarić (Semi-finals, revival)

Present
After the end of the Operacija trijumf, the Emotion Production formed a band named "OT Band", consisting of four participants – Vukašin Brajić, Đorđe Gogov, Nikola Paunović and Nikola Sarić. The band took part in the Beovizija 2009, the Serbian national election for the Eurovision Song Contest 2009. Their song, named "Blagoslov za kraj", was written by E. Owen, S. Vukomanović and E. Botric, and was produced at the Universal Music Group. The band placed the 2nd, behind Marko Kon and his song "Cipela". OT Band and the rest of Operacija trijumf contestants held two sold-out concerts at Belgrade's Sava Centar, on 19 and 20 April 2009.

Discography

Albums
 2009: Compilation of the Operacija trijumf contestants

OT Band singles
 2009: "Blagoslov za kraj" (feat. Kaya)
 2009: "Strpi se još malo" (cover of Take That's "Patience")
 2009: "Zaboravi" (feat Karolina Goceva)
 2013: "TBA"

Solo singles
 2008:"Ovu noc"

References

External links
 Đorđe Gogov at the Operacija trijumf official website

1988 births
Living people
People from Dimitrovgrad, Serbia
Serbian pop singers
Serbian television personalities
Serbian tenors